Nowiny may refer to:

Nowiny, Lower Silesian Voivodeship (south-west Poland)
Nowiny, Włocławek County in Kuyavian-Pomeranian Voivodeship (north-central Poland)
Nowiny, Żnin County in Kuyavian-Pomeranian Voivodeship (north-central Poland)
Nowiny, Chełm County in Lublin Voivodeship (east Poland)
Nowiny, Krasnystaw County in Lublin Voivodeship (east Poland)
Nowiny, Hajnówka County in Podlaskie Voivodeship (north-east Poland)
Nowiny, Łomża County in Podlaskie Voivodeship (north-east Poland)
Nowiny, Lublin County in Lublin Voivodeship (east Poland)
Nowiny, Gmina Będków in Łódź Voivodeship (central Poland)
Nowiny, Gmina Żelechlinek in Łódź Voivodeship (central Poland)
Nowiny, Radzyń Podlaski County in Lublin Voivodeship (east Poland)
Nowiny, Ryki County in Lublin Voivodeship (east Poland)
Nowiny, Świdnik County in Lublin Voivodeship (east Poland)
Nowiny, Gmina Susiec in Lublin Voivodeship (east Poland)
Nowiny, Włodawa County in Lublin Voivodeship (east Poland)
Nowiny, Włoszczowa County in Świętokrzyskie Voivodeship (south-central Poland)
Nowiny, Subcarpathian Voivodeship (south-east Poland)
Nowiny, Kozienice County in Masovian Voivodeship (east-central Poland)
Nowiny, Gmina Leoncin in Masovian Voivodeship (east-central Poland)
Nowiny, Gmina Nasielsk in Masovian Voivodeship (east-central Poland)
Nowiny, Gostyń County in Greater Poland Voivodeship (west-central Poland)
Nowiny, Kalisz County in Greater Poland Voivodeship (west-central Poland)
Nowiny, Konin County in Greater Poland Voivodeship (west-central Poland)
Nowiny, Złotów County in Greater Poland Voivodeship (west-central Poland)
Nowiny, Silesian Voivodeship (south Poland)
Nowiny, Lubusz Voivodeship (west Poland)
Nowiny, Człuchów County in Pomeranian Voivodeship (north Poland)
Nowiny, Gdańsk County in Pomeranian Voivodeship (north Poland)
Nowiny, Kartuzy County in Pomeranian Voivodeship (north Poland)
Nowiny, Kościerzyna County in Pomeranian Voivodeship (north Poland)
Nowiny, Gmina Sztum in Pomeranian Voivodeship (north Poland)
Nowiny, Gmina Dzierzgoń in Pomeranian Voivodeship (north Poland)
Nowiny, Wejherowo County in Pomeranian Voivodeship (north Poland)
Nowiny, Braniewo County in Warmian-Masurian Voivodeship (north Poland)
Nowiny, Elbląg County in Warmian-Masurian Voivodeship (north Poland)
Nowiny, Gołdap County in Warmian-Masurian Voivodeship (north Poland)
Nowiny, Szczytno County in Warmian-Masurian Voivodeship (north Poland)
Nowiny, West Pomeranian Voivodeship (north-west Poland)
Nowiny, Kielce County in Świętokrzyskie Voivodeship (central Poland)